Frédéricque Rufin Goporo (born 8 August 1966) is a Central African former basketball player and coach. He was elected Most Valuable Player at the FIBA Africa Championship 1987, a tournament his team won. Goporo competed at the 1988 Summer Olympics with the Central African Republic national basketball team and scored in double digits for 6 out of the team's 7 games. He also coached the team from 2012 to 2013.

He is the older brother of fellow basketball player and coach Aubin-Thierry Goporo.

References

1966 births
Living people
Central African Republic men's basketball players
Olympic basketball players of the Central African Republic
Basketball players at the 1988 Summer Olympics